Târgu Cărbunești is a town in Gorj County, Oltenia, Romania with a population of 8,034 (as of 2011). It lies in the south-eastern part of the county and administers ten villages: Blahnița de Jos, Cărbunești-Sat, Cojani, Crețești, Curteana, Floreșteni, Măceșu, Pojogeni, Rogojeni, and Ștefănești.

Natives
 Cristian Albeanu (born 1971), footballer.
 Florin Cioabă, (1954–2013), Pentecostal minister and self-proclaimed King of the Gypsies.
 Ion Sburlea (born 1971), footballer. 
 Lidia Șimon (born 1973), long-distance runner.

References

Towns in Romania
Populated places in Gorj County
Localities in Oltenia
Monotowns in Romania